Lepcha is a genus of beetles in the family Carabidae, containing the following species:

 Lepcha bran Morvan, 1997
 Lepcha cameroni Morvan, 1997
 Lepcha deliae Morvan, 1997
 Lepcha gogonasensis Morvan, 1982
 Lepcha heinigeri Morvan, 1997
 Lepcha holzschuhi Morvan, 1997
 Lepcha jelepa Andrewes, 1930
 Lepcha lampra Andrewes, 1930
 Lepcha lassallei Morvan, 1997
 Lepcha ovoidea Morvan, 1997
 Lepcha pygmaea Habu, 1973
 Lepcha similis Morvan, 1997
 Lepcha subdiscola Morvan, 1997

References

Platyninae
Taxa named by Herbert Edward Andrewes
Carabidae genera